Framework convention may refer to:

Framework Convention Alliance for Tobacco Control, in the United States
Framework Convention for the Protection of National Minorities, by the Council of Europe
Framework Convention for the Protection of the Marine Environment of the Caspian Sea
Framework Convention on the Protection and Sustainable Development of the Carpathians
Kyoto Protocol to the United Nations Framework Convention on Climate Change
United Nations Framework Convention on Climate Change
World Health Organization Framework Convention on Tobacco Control

See also 
Framework (disambiguation)